The Port of Uusikaupunki (also known as Port of Hepokari) is a mixed-use cargo port located in the city of Uusikaupunki, in southwestern Finland, on the eastern shore of the Bothnian Sea.

The port services mostly RoRo traffic, but is also equipped to handle conventional and liquid cargo.

In 2018, the total international cargo throughput of the port was  2.5m tons. Approximately 60% of this was exports, making Uusikaupunki the 10th largest export port in Finland. It is the main Finnish export port for cars, thanks to the Valmet Automotive plant located in Uusikaupunki.

References

External links

Ports and harbours of Finland
Water transport in Finland
Buildings and structures in Southwest Finland
Uusikaupunki